Boračeva (in older sources also Boračova) is a village in the Municipality of Radenci in northeastern Slovenia.

There is a small chapel-shrine in the centre of the settlement. It was built in 1874.

References

External links 
Boračeva on Geopedia

Populated places in the Municipality of Radenci